Ros or ROS or RoS may refer to:

Organizations
 Raggruppamento Operativo Speciale, the Anti-organized Crime Branch of the Italian Carabinieri
 Registers of Scotland, a Scottish authority responsible for compiling and maintaining records
 Reparti i Operacioneve Speciale, a former Albanian special forces unit
 IL ROS, Norwegian football team

People and titles
Scottish Gaelic spelling of the name Ross
 Baron de Ros

Surname
 Arno Ros (born 1942), German philosopher
 Carmen Ros Nortes (born 1953), Catholic nun and Vatican official 
 Edmundo Ros (1910–2011), Trinidadian-British musician
 Enrique Ros (1924–2013), Cuban-American businessman and activist
 Fran Roš (1898–1976), Slovene writer
 Giuseppe Ros (1942–2022), Italian boxer
 Iñigo Ros (born 1982), Spanish footballer
 Isidro Ros Ríos (born 1995), Spanish footballer
 Jaime Ros, (born 1952), Spanish alpine skier
 Javier Ros (born 1990), Spanish footballer
 José Ros García (1920–2001), Spanish poet
 Lázaro Ros (1925–2005), Cuban singer
 Ramón Ros (born 1981), Spanish footballer
 Richard Ros (born 1429), English poet
 Amanda McKittrick Ros (1860–1939), Irish writer
 Mohd Remezey Che Ros (born 1982), Malaysian footballer
 Uilleam Ros, Scottish Gaelic poet
 Juan Antonio Ros (born 1996), Spanish footballer
 Ros Saboeut (c. 1942–2014), Cambodian musician
 Ros Serey Sothea (1948–1977), Cambodian singer
 Ros Sopheap (born 1962), Cambodian women's rights activist

Given name
 Ros Atkins (born 1974), British journalist
 Ros Bates (born 1962), Australian politician
 Ros Childs (born 1967), British journalist
 Ros Drinkwater (born 1944), Scottish actress
 Ros Evans (born 1960), British athlete
 Ros Kelly (born 1948), Australian politician
 Ros Kember (born 1985), New Zealand cricketer
 Ros Pesman (born 1938), Australian historian
 Ros Spence (born 1970), Australian politician
 Ros Myers, fictional character

Places
 Lake Roś, Poland
 Republic of Singapore, a country in South-East Asia
 Reserve Officer School, a conscript training facility in Finland
 Ros', Belarus, a town in Grodno Region, Belarus
 Rosario - Islas Malvinas International Airport, Argentina
 Ros (river), Ukraine

Science and technology
 Reactive oxygen species, chemically reactive molecules containing oxygen
 ReactOS, a free and open-source operating system intended to be binary-compatible with Windows NT
 ROS1, receptor tyrosine kinase
 ROS, a weak signal sound card mode for Amateur Radio
 Robot Operating System, an open source robotics platform by Willow Garage and Stanford AI Labs
 ROM Operating System, a ROMed version of Digital Research's DR DOS
 Russian Orbital Segment, components of the International Space Station
 Random orbital sander, also called palm sander, a hand power tool

Other uses
 Ros (grape), another name for the wine grape Mourvèdre
 Ros (vehicles), a Greek light truck manufacturer
 Reaper of Souls, an expansion to the game Diablo 3
 Return on sales, an accounting ratio that detects operational efficiency
 Revenue On-Line Service, a tax returns system used in Ireland
 Review of systems, medical

See also
 Ross (disambiguation)
 Da Ros, surname
 Rosas (surname), of which Ros is a spelling variation 
 RDOS (disambiguation)